Danny Lopez (born 1974) is the CEO of cybersecurity firm Glasswall and a board member of Innovate Finance and Aquis Stock Exchange. Between 2011 and 2016 Lopez was the British Consul-General to New York and Director-General of the Department for International Trade in the United States and Canada.

Career 

Lopez started his career at Barclays in 1996. During his ten years there he held a number of senior international positions, including Head of Global Inward Investment in London, Director of Business Banking in New York and Director of Business Development in India.

In 2006, Lopez joined the executive team at the Department for International Trade (formerly UK Trade & Investment), the UK government's foreign commercial arm. From 2009 to 2011 Lopez worked for Boris Johnson, then Mayor of London,and led the establishment of business and tourism agency London & Partners, becoming its inaugural CEO.

In 2011, the role of British Consul-General to New York was opened up to applicants outside the Foreign and Commonwealth Office, and Lopez was confirmed as the successful candidate, becoming the youngest-ever holder of the position. As the senior British diplomat to New York for five years, he was responsible for promoting the UK's economic profile, foreign policy and national security priorities. In addition, Lopez led the Department for International Trade's presence across North America. During his tenure, Lopez hosted the Duke and Duchess of Cambridge during their visit to New York in December 2014. Lopez also actively promoted the expansion of high-tech US start-ups into the UK and facilitated collaboration between the tech industries of both countries. 

In 2016, Lopez left his diplomatic position and returned to the private sector. He became the COO at technology company Blippar, a role he held for two years before stepping down in July 2018. In 2016, Lopez was appointed a special advisor to New York-based venture capital firm FinTech Collective and in 2017 he joined the board of Innovate Finance, the industry body that champions the UK's global fintech community. In 2019, Lopez was appointed CEO of award-winning cybersecurity firm Glasswall. In 2020, Lopez was appointed a Council Member and Trustee at the University of Essex, his alma mater.In 2021, Lopez joined the board of Aquis Stock Exchange.

Lopez speaks regularly on platforms across the world on topics including geopolitics and the intersection of market-disrupting technologies and government policy.

In May 2022 Lopez received the Freedom of the City of London at a ceremony held at Guildhall, the ceremonial and administrative centre of the City of London.

Personal life 

Born in England to José Antonio and Elizabeth, and brought up in Spain, Lopez was educated at the Marists School of Zaragoza. Fluent in both English and Spanish, he holds a Bachelor of Arts (Honours) in economics and a master's degree in international economics and finance from the University of Essex. In 2012 he married his Australian fiancée, Susan Grieve. They have three children: Lucy, Stella and Alexander.

References

External links
Glasswall Solutions
BritWeek: Board of Directors: 
Danny Lopez – GOV.UK
Introduction: New Consul-General, Danny Lopez – British American Business Council of Greater Philadelphia

1974 births
Living people
Alumni of the University of Essex
British diplomats
Businesspeople from New York City